Fonó Zenekar, the Fonó Folk Band is a Hungarian folk band, playing traditional Hungarian music.

History 

Fonó Folk Band was founded in 1997 in Budapest. Its members are musicians from around Hungary and its various historical regions such as the Hungarian-minority areas of Slovakia and Ukraine, who have devoted their careers to performing, teaching and researching traditional folk music. Their repertoire consist of Magyar and other Carpathian-Basin peoples' instrumental and vocal music, and authentic arrangements in these traditions. The members of the band themselves collect folk music - an experience they use to boost the band's repertoire.

Members 

 Andrea Navratil - vocals
 Gergely Agócs - vocals, tárogató, bagpipe, fujara, flutes
 Tamás Gombai - violin, second violin
 István Pál “Szalonna” - violin, second violin
 Sándor D. Tóth - viola, hurdy-gurdy, gardon, drum, cobsa, zither
 Zsolt Kürtösi – doublebass, cello, accordion
 Balint Tarkany-Kovacs - cimbalom

Discography 

 Sok szép napot éjszakával [A Lot of Beautiful Days and Nights] - Honvéd edition, Budapest 1998
 Árgyélus kismadár [The Little Bird] - Hungarian folk music from Southern Slovakia (with singer Gyöngyi Écsi) - Fonó Records, Budapest, 2000
 Musique de danse Hongroise - Anthology of Hungarian folk music, Buda Musique, Paris, 2001
 Mixtura Cultivalis – Folk music from the Carpathian Basin, Fonó Records, Budapest, 2002
 Túlparton / Other side – Art Music of Béla Bartók and its Folk Roots, Hungaroton, Budapest, 2004
 Hateha! – Evergreens of the Dance House - Hungarian folk music, Fonó edition, Budapest, 2009

Awards 

 2003 – Choc de l’Année (''Le Monde de la musique, Paris)
 2005 – eMeRTon (Magyar Rádió - Hungarian State Broadcasting Company, Budapest)
 2006 – Kodály Price (Magyar Művészeti Akadémia - Hungarian Academy of Arts, Budapest)

References 
http://www.fonozenekar.hu/pages/ang_bemutatkozas.htm

Hungarian folk music groups